The 1st Squadron was a squadron of the 1st Air Wing of the Japan Air Self-Defense Force based at Hamamatsu Air Base, in Shizuoka Prefecture, Japan. It was equipped with North American F-86F Sabre aircraft.

History
On January 10, 1956 the squadron was formed at Hamamatsu Air Base in Shizuoka Prefecture. It was the first fighter squadron formed by Japan since the Imperial Japanese Army Air Service and the Imperial Japanese Navy Air Service were dissolved at the end of World War II. It was responsible for training pilots.

It was disbanded on March 31, 1979. At that time the type of aircraft operated by a Japanese fighter squadron was linked to the type of aircraft operated. Squadrons 1–11 were F-86F squadrons.

Aircraft operated

Fighter aircraft
 North American F-86F Sabre（1956–1979）

See also
 Fighter units of the Japan Air Self-Defense Force

References

Units of the Japan Air Self-Defense Force